Sandergrove is a locality in the Australian state of South Australia about 9 km (5.5 mi) south of Strathalbyn. It was a junction on the Victor Harbor railway line, where the Milang railway line branched off. The railway was authorised in 1881 and closed in 1970.

The north-western end of the Nurragi Conservation Reserve, a private protected area which follows the alignment of the former Milang railway line as a rail trail, terminates at Sandergrove.

History
In 1863, the Strathalbyn Methodist circuit included a church at Sandergrove. It still existed in 1900, but it was not part of the circuit by 1963.
The Sandergrove Primary School opened in 1923, but has since closed.

References

Towns in South Australia